The term naval conference can refer to various conferences that took place during the early 20th century that aimed to regulate naval warfare and armaments. These agreements were completely abandoned by the time World War II had started in 1939. The following conferences can be included under this definition:

 1908–1909 London Naval Conference
 1921–1922 Washington Naval Conference
 1927: Geneva Naval Conference
 1930 London Naval Conference, leading to the London Naval Treaty
 1935 London Naval Conference, leading to the Second London Naval Treaty

Arms control